Elizabeth McCoy (February 1, 1903 – March 24, 1978) was an American microbiologist and a professor at the University of Wisconsin–Madison.

Biography
McCoy was born in Madison, Wisconsin, February 1, 1903. Her parents, Esther Williamson and Cassius James McCoy, were both college educated. Her mother was a professor and then an active practicing nurse for six years. McCoy's mother taught her basic microbiology and about respiratory diseases. Her father was a professor at the college but for health reasons had to retire. While growing up, McCoy was already interested in microbiology.

McCoy received her Ph.D. from the University of Wisconsin in 1929. She joined the school's faculty after earning her degree and was one of the first women to become a full professor there. Her research included significant contributions in multiple areas within microbiology, and she became one of the first prominent women within the field. While working on a government project at the University of Wisconsin during World War II, McCoy discovered a Penicillium strain producing 900 times as much penicillin as Alexander Fleming's strain; this discovery enabled to the drug's widespread commercial production.

McCoy had many other research accomplishments.  She developed the antibiotic oligomycin; while the drug never became a useful treatment for disease, it is still used in research. She also was part of the team that first discovered Moorella thermoacetica, a model organism important to developing our understanding of the Acetyl Co-A metabolic pathway. McCoy's other research included work in soil microbiology, the microbiology of water bodies, and botulism.

McCoy's house in Fitchburg, where she lived from 1949 until her death, is listed on the National Register of Historic Places.

Select publications
 The anaerobic bacteria and their activities in nature and disease; a subject bibliography, 1939 and 1941
 Role of bacteria in the nitrogen cycle in lakes, 1972
 The anaerobic bacteria and their activities in nature and disease, 1941
 A cytological and histological study of the root nodules of the bean, Phaseolus vulgaris L., 1929 
 The anaerobic bacteria and their activities in nature and disease

References

1903 births
1978 deaths
People from Fitchburg, Wisconsin
American microbiologists
University of Wisconsin–Madison alumni
University of Wisconsin–Madison faculty
Women microbiologists
20th-century American women scientists
20th-century American scientists
American science writers
20th-century American women writers
American women academics